The 2013 Conference USA men's soccer season was the 19th season of men's varsity soccer in the conference. The season marked the arrival of the Charlotte 49ers from the Atlantic 10 Conference, the Florida Atlantic Owls from the Mid-American Conference, the New Mexico Lobos from the Mountain Pacific Sports Federation, and the Old Dominion Monarchs from the Colonial Athletic Association. It was also be the last C-USA season for the Tulsa Golden Hurricane, which joined join the American Athletic Conference in July 2014. The 2013 Conference USA Men's Soccer Tournament was held November 13–17 at Transamerica Field in Charlotte.

The defending regular season champions were the SMU Mustangs, who left the conference to join The American. The defending tournament champions were the Tulsa Golden Hurricane.

Changes from 2012 

 Charlotte, Florida Atlantic, and Old Dominion joined C-USA as all-sports members, while New Mexico joined for men's soccer only. 
 Memphis, SMU and UCF left C-USA to join The American.

Season outlook

Teams

Stadia and locations

Standings

C-USA Tournament 

The format for the 2013 Conference USA Men's Soccer Tournament was announced in the Fall of 2013.

Results

Statistics

References 

 
2013 NCAA Division I men's soccer season